Lord Chaos is a fictional character appearing in American comic books published by Marvel Comics.

Publication history

The character first appeared in Marvel Two-In-One Annual #2 (1977), and was created by Jim Starlin.

Fictional character biography
Lord Chaos is an abstract entity that embodies disarray and confusion and is the opposing force to "brother" entity Master Order. The pair are rarely seen, but appear to manipulate events to prompt Spider-Man to solicit the Thing to join the Avengers and Warlock in the first war against the Titan Thanos and defeat him. Lord Chaos and Master Order were then seen observing King of the Norse Gods Odin and master villain Dormammu play a cosmic game of chess. Lord Chaos and Master Order next conspired with other metaphysical and "omnipotent" beings against the Beyonder. Lord Chaos and Master Order were then summoned by the Silver Surfer to regain control over their servant the In-Betweener. They imprisoned the In-Betweener for his transgressions. Lord Chaos and Master Order also attend the funeral of Eon and speak with cosmic hero Quasar.

Lord Chaos and Master Order participated in the congress of metaphysical and abstract beings to determine Thanos' fitness to wield the Infinity Gauntlet. They chose to join Adam Warlock and the other cosmic deities in a bid to stop Thanos. With the other abstract beings, they battled Thanos, and then battled Nebula when she obtained the Gauntlet from Thanos. The congress of abstract beings then witnessed Adam Warlock's cosmic trial to determine his worthiness to wield the Infinity Gauntlet. Lord Chaos and Master Order were next seen among a group of abstract beings questioning the Beyonder from the Dimension of Manifestations.

In Infinity Crusade it is learned that they must obey the dictates of Eternity and Infinity.

During the Time Runs Out storyline, the Beyonders are revealed to have killed Lord Chaos, Master Order, and the In-Betweener as part of destroying abstract entities in each reality across the multiverse.

Following the restoration of the universe after the Secret Wars, Lord Chaos along with Master Order became disgruntled by Galactus' evolution from a force of destruction to a force of creation. They eventually put Galactus on trial before the Living Tribunal. The Tribunal ruled in Galactus' favor and allowed him to remain in his new form, claiming that the universe being in a new iteration meant the cosmic hierarchy wasn't established anew. Master Order and Lord Chaos took this council to heart, and murdered the Tribunal in order to take his place as the personification of multiversal law.

They attempted to turn Galactus back to his world-devourer form. However, for the same reason Order and Chaos could kill the Living Tribunal, they couldn't stop Galactus from fighting back his transformation. If there wasn't a hierarchy yet, it meant Galactus was also on the same level as Order and Chaos, so they couldn't impose their will on him. Because of this, Order and Chaos traveled to their servant, the In-Betweener, and forced him to become the uniting force in a fusion that combined Master Order and Lord Chaos into a single being, the self-proclaimed new order, Logos.

Powers and abilities
Lord Chaos is an abstract being who embodies the metaphysical concept of Chaos; as such it has no physical form, although on occasion it has manifested as an image of a disembodied bald inhumanly warped and distorted male head.

It has been implied that Lord Chaos, and its counterpart, Master Order, have vast powers which they use to manipulate events within their sphere of influence in subtle ways. It is known that, through some as yet unknown process, Lord Chaos and Master Order worked together to create the metaphysical being known as the In-Betweener.

Thanos wielding the Infinity Gauntlet ranked Lord Chaos' scale of power as above that of Galactus, but below that of Eternity.

However later he and Master Order were able to easily kill Living Tribunal by blasting him with energy and also defeat Lifebringer Galactus after transforming into Logos.

Other versions
Lord Chaos and Master Order battle Thanos once more in an alternate universe when he possesses the Heart of the Universe.

References

External links
 Lord Chaos at Marvel.com

Characters created by Jim Starlin
Marvel Comics abstract concepts